Somerset Aerodrome  is located  southwest of Somerset, Manitoba, Canada.

References

Registered aerodromes in Manitoba